Lazareff may refer to:

 Hélène Gordon-Lazareff
 Serge Lazareff
 Michèle Rosier (Lazareff)

See also 
 Lazarev (disambiguation)